Gilles Chabrier is a French astrophysicist.

Life and scientific work 

Chabrier studied physics at the École normale supérieure de Lyon (ENS) in Lyon.  After completing his PhD he continued his research at the University of Rochester.  In the early 1990s he built up a research group at the ENS Lyon in collaboration with the nearby Lyon Observatory. In 1995, the Centre de recherche astronomique de Lyon was founded, known as the Centre de Recherche Astrophysics Lyon (CRAL) since 2007. Chabrier continues to lead one of the research groups at CRAL.  He is also a research director at the Centre national de la recherche scientifique (CNRS).

Chabrier is best known for his work on brown dwarfs. Before their discovery in 1995, in collaboration with Isabelle Baraffe, France Allard and Didier Saumon, he helped to develop the theory of the structure of brown dwarfs.

Awards 
 2006 CNRS Silver Medal
 2010 Jean Ricard Prize
 2012 Eddington Medal
 2014 Ampère Prize
 2019 Fred Hoyle Medal and Prize

References 

French astrophysicists
Living people
Year of birth missing (living people)